One ship of the Royal Navy has borne the name HMS Duff, whilst another was planned:

  was a Captain-class frigate, previously USS Lamons. She was launched in 1943, returned to the US Navy in 1945 and scrapped in 1946.

Royal Navy ship names